The Nenana Ice Classic is an annual ice pool contest held in Nenana, Alaska. It is an event in which individuals attempt to guess the exact time the Tanana River ice will break up at Nenana. Tickets are on sale from February 1 through April 5 of each year throughout Alaska. The Nenana Ice Classic is a non-profit charitable gaming organization. As such, the proceeds benefit many volunteer and non-profit organizations.

History
The Ice Classic began as an ice betting pool in 1906 with six entries: Adolph Nelson, Jim Duke, Gunnysack Jack, Jonesy, Louis and Joe Johnson, and the first winner, Oliver Lee. After coming the closest to betting on breakup of the Tanana ice, Lee won an equivalent amount of "a couple of rounds at the trading post bar." The ice pool subsequently became inactive until 1916. In that year, railroad workers revived the betting through ticket sales at Jimmy Duke's Roadhouse, but limited the betting to Nenana residents. After word of the lottery spread to towns along the local railroad by Alaska Railroad Commission workers, the lottery was opened up to residents of the Alaska and Yukon territories in 1917.

In 1917, railroad engineers bet $801 on when the ice would break. In 2009 the 93rd annual prize money was $283,723. In 2014 the jackpot was a record $363,627. Since the Classic's beginning in 1906 over 10 million dollars in prize money has been given away.

Mid-March 2020 saw the COVID-19 pandemic as grounds for betting remotely.

The tripod
The "tripod", which actually has four supports, is planted on the river ice between the highway and railroad bridges in Nenana, 300 ft from the shore. The tripod is connected to a clock which stops as the ice goes out, moving the tripod with it. The Nenana Ice Classic annual festival is the time that the tripod is erected on the ice of the frozen Tanana River. The tripod parts are built and painted prior to the festival sourcing local timber and enlisting community members. Using a chainsaw, a trough is carved into the river ice which is usually around three feet thick at that time of year. The base of the tripod is lowered into the trough. An auger is implemented to bore a hole further into the ice until the river water is released, flooding the trough. This will freeze the tripod securely to the frozen river. As a high point during the festival the community gathers together and using ropes attached to the tripod uprights they work together to lift the uprights into place. The uprights are then secured to each other. A line is attached to the top of the tripod and once that end is anchored the other end is taken to the Ice Classic tower nearby on the banks of the river. Attached there to the clock inside the tower, when the ice goes out and moves the tripod 100 feet the line breaks and stops the clock.

Ice measurements
The ice then melts on top due to weather and bottom due to water movement.

In popular culture
In March 2022, the contest was featured on HBO show Last Week Tonight with John Oliver where the host pledged a donation to the Food Bank of Alaska.

References

External links
 

1906 establishments in Alaska
Annual events in Alaska
Charity events in the United States
Non-profit organizations based in Alaska
Recurring events established in 1906
Tourist attractions in Yukon–Koyukuk Census Area, Alaska
Tanana Athabaskans